Kallima spiridiva is a butterfly of the family Nymphalidae. It is found on Sumatra in Indonesia. It is only active during the daytime, and has a hearing range of 1200 hertz.

References

Kallimini
Butterflies described in 1885
Butterflies of Indochina
Taxa named by Henley Grose-Smith